Amy Chan MBE (also known as Chan Lim Chee; born 27 June 1961) is a retired badminton player from Hong Kong who won gold medals in World championships and Commonwealth games.

About 
Chan has two brothers and one sister (Chen Aici), who grew up in the East Block of North Point New Village on Hong Kong Island in her early years. Her father was a clerk. She graduated from Ho Tung Government Industrial Girls' High School (now renamed Ho Tung Middle School) in 1980, and then enrolled in Luo Phu Quoc Education College, and completed the physical education course in 1983. She then graduated from the Department of Physical Education of Springfield University in 1991. Chan won the women's singles championship in nine Hong Kong badminton tournaments from 1975 to 1983. In 1979, aged only 17, she won the mixed doubles championship at the World Badminton Championships (WBF) partnering Ng Chun Ching.

In 1988, she represented Hong Kong in the 1988 Summer Olympics badminton competition (the current event was an exhibition event), and partnered with Chan Chi Choi to win the mixed doubles bronze medal. She represented Hong Kong in three Commonwealth Games across three disciplines, winning the mixed doubles gold medal in 1990. After her sporting career she became the first female headmistress of the Hong Kong jockey club apprentice Jockey's school which trains and develops future racing stars.

Amy contributes much to the society. She currently holds many leadership positions in various organizations and committees such as the Commission on Poverty, Prevention and Control of Non-communicable Disease, Hong Kong Paralympian Fund and the Hong Kong Elite Athletes Association. Her contribution to sports development and devotion to community service has made her a role model for many in Hong Kong.

Honours 
Order of the British Empire, Member of the Order of the British Empire (MBE) (1991)
Ten Outstanding Young People in Hong Kong (1995)
Honorary Fellow of The Education University of Hong Kong (2019)

Achievements

Olympic Games (exhibition) 
Mixed doubles

World Championships 
Mixed doubles

Commonwealth Games 
Mixed doubles

IBF World Grand Prix 
The World Badminton Grand Prix sanctioned by International Badminton Federation (IBF) from 1983 to 2006.

Mixed doubles

Invitational tournament 

Mixed doubles

References

External links 
 
 
 
 

1961 births
Living people
Hong Kong female badminton players
Badminton players at the 1982 Commonwealth Games
Badminton players at the 1986 Commonwealth Games
Badminton players at the 1990 Commonwealth Games
Commonwealth Games gold medallists for Hong Kong
Commonwealth Games medallists in badminton
Badminton players at the 1988 Summer Olympics
Medallists at the 1990 Commonwealth Games